Clytiomya is a genus of flies in the family Tachinidae.

Species
C. continua (Panzer, 1798)
C. dupuisi Kugler, 1971
C. mesnili Kugler, 1968
C. pratensis (Robineau-Desvoidy, 1830)
C. sola (Rondani, 1861)
C. vaga (Robineau-Desvoidy, 1830)
C. vernalis (Robineau-Desvoidy, 1863)

References

Phasiinae
Tachinidae genera
Taxa named by Camillo Rondani